The archbishop of Montreal is the head of the Roman Catholic Archdiocese of Montreal, responsible for looking after its spiritual and administrative needs.  This archdiocese is the metropolitan see of the ecclesiastical province encompassing the south-central part of the Canadian province of Quebec, which includes the suffragan dioceses of Joliette, Saint-Jean–Longueuil, Saint-Jérôme–Mont-Laurier, and Valleyfield.  The current archbishop is Christian Lépine.

The archdiocese began as the Diocese of Montreal, which was established on May 13, 1836.  Jean-Jacques Lartigue was appointed its first bishop without prior approval from the British government.  Consequently, this set the precedent under which the colonial authorities in Canada began to curtail their interference in the internal matters of the Church, such as the appointment of bishops and the creation of new dioceses.  On June 8, 1886, the diocese was elevated to the status of archdiocese by Pope Pius IX.  Édouard-Charles Fabre became the first archbishop of the newly formed metropolitan see.

Eight men have been Archbishop of Montreal; another two were bishop of its predecessor diocese.  Of these, two were members of the Society of the Priests of Saint Sulpice (PSS).  Three archbishops – Paul-Émile Léger, Paul Grégoire, and Jean-Claude Turcotte – were elevated to the College of Cardinals.  Lartigue, the first ordinary of the archdiocese, was also the first of seven bishops and archbishops of Montreal who were born in the city.  Paul Bruchési had the longest tenure as Archbishop of Montreal, serving for 42 years (1897–1939), while his immediate successor Georges Gauthier held the position for eleven months (1939–1940), marking the shortest episcopacy.

List of ordinaries

Bishops of Montreal

Archbishops of Montreal

Notes

References

Specific

General

Christianity in Montreal
Montreal
Montreal-related lists